Hahniharmia is a genus of spiders in the family Hahniidae. It was first described in 2004 by Wunderlich. , it contains only one species, Hahniharmia picta. The genus is named in honour of German arachnologist Marie Harm.

References

Hahniidae
Monotypic Araneomorphae genera
Spiders of Europe